Masters degrees in pharmacy  comprise both postgraduate and integrated master's programs in Pharmacy, the latter of which comprising both undergraduate and postgraduate coursework and typically taking four to five years to complete.

Finland 

In Finland, proviisori is an academic degree awarded after completing the post graduate program in pharmacy. The degree is equivalent to English term Master of Pharmacy. A proviisori degree is required in order to be a druggist in Finland. Pharmacy is taught in University of Helsinki and University of Eastern Finland.

Israel
Starting in 2017, the Ben Gurion University of the Negev has begun offering a 2-year Master's program in Community Clinical Pharmacy and Regulatory Management. The program is available to Bachelor of Pharmacy graduates whom are listed as registered pharmacists in the country, with at least 2 years of work experience.

Malta 
The University of Malta, Department of Pharmacy within the Faculty of Medicine & Surgery, offers a Master of Pharmacy (M.Pharm.) course for students who have successfully completed the Bachelor of Science (Hons.) in Pharmaceutical Science. The MPharm is a requirement in obtaining the warrant to practice as a Pharmacist in Malta.

Poland 

In Poland, magister farmacji (abbreviated to mgr farmacji) is an academic degree awarded following five and a half years of academic study in pharmacy. Completing a dissertation in this area is a prerequisite. The degree is equivalent to American Pharm.D.

Ukraine 

National University of Pharmacy - Kharkiv 
Ternopil State Medical University - Ternopil
Danylo Halytsky Lviv National Medical University - Lviv
Kharkiv Medical Academy of Post-graduate Education - Kharkiv
Kyiv Medical University of UAFM - Kyiv

United Kingdom

In the United Kingdom, MPharm is a postgraduate academic degree awarded following four years of academic study in pharmacy. The degree is awarded by all of the schools of pharmacy in the UK and superseded the BSc (Pharmacy) or BPharm degree when the length of the undergraduate pharmacy course was increased from three to four years in 1997—partly due to EU harmonization of pharmacy training and partly to extend the scope of the undergraduate degree.

The MPharm is the only qualification in the UK which leads to professional registration as a pharmacist. MPharm programs are accredited by the General Pharmaceutical Council (GPhC) in England, Scotland and Wales, and Pharmaceutical Society of Northern Ireland (PSNI) in Northern Ireland. Aspiring pharmacists in the UK qualify by first completing this degree, then undertaking a year of pre-registration training. On successful completion of this training, and after passing the pre-registration exam, they become registered pharmacists. In Great Britain it used to be the case, until September 2010, that with registration they became members of the Royal Pharmaceutical Society of Great Britain, able to use the postnominal letters MRPharmS (Member of the Royal Pharmaceutical Society of Great Britain). However, the RPS split off its regulatory role in September 2010 and the new regulatory body, the GPhC, does not grant postnominals to its registrants.  MRPharmS is still granted by the RPS to its member but no longer has an automatic link to current registration as a pharmacist.  In Northern Ireland regulation has not been removed from the PSNI and therefore registration as a pharmacist and membership of the PSNI are still simultaneous, granting use of the postnominals MPSNI (Member of the Pharmaceutical Society of Northern Ireland).

England

Aston University – Birmingham
University of Bath – Bath
University of Birmingham – Birmingham
University of Bradford – Bradford
University of Brighton – Brighton
University of Central Lancashire – Preston
De Montfort University – Leicester
University of Durham – Durham (transferring to Newcastle University in September 2017)
University of East Anglia – Norwich
University of Huddersfield – Huddersfield
Keele University – Keele
King’s College London - Waterloo, London
Kingston University - Kingston upon Thames, London (Co-taught at St George's, University of London.)
Medway School of Pharmacy – University of Greenwich/University of Kent
University College London - Bloomsbury, London (previously School of Pharmacy, University of London)
Liverpool John Moores University – Liverpool
University of Hertfordshire – Hatfield
University of Lincoln - Lincolnshire
University of Manchester – Manchester
University of Nottingham – Nottingham
University of Portsmouth – Portsmouth
University of Reading – Reading
University of Sussex – Sussex
University of Sunderland – Sunderland
University of Wolverhampton – Wolverhampton

Northern Ireland

Queen's University Belfast (QUB) – Belfast
University of Ulster (UU) - Coleraine

Scotland

University of Strathclyde – Glasgow
Robert Gordon University – Aberdeen

Wales

Cardiff University (Cardiff School of Pharmacy and Pharmaceutical Sciences) – Cardiff

Ireland 
In Ireland, the MPharm is awarded after five years: four years of undergraduate study leading to a BSc.Pharm and a one-year placement in a community or hospital pharmacy setting.

Universities

University College Cork - Cork
Royal College of Surgeons in Ireland - Dublin
Trinity College, Dublin - Dublin

India / Australia 
Master of Pharmacy (MPharma) in India is offered as post graduate (graduate) course after completion of BPharma degree. The MPharma course is normally of two years duration. In some universities it is one-year research and one year theory examination, while some offers M Pharm by research completely leading to doctorate degree. The course focuses on specialisation in the field of pharmacy. The MPharma courses are offered by pharmacy colleges affiliated to unite leading to entry into the pharmacy profession. In 2004, the University of Newcastle introduced a two-year postgraduate MPharm coursework program, to provide an alternative means to gain qualification for registration to practice as a pharmacist for graduates with a bachelor's degree in any science or medical science that includes the required prerequisites. The MPharm degree is not an advanced follow-up degree for pharmacists. Following the commencement of the MPharm program at the University of Newcastle, other universities across Australia also began offering MPharm coursework programs. At present, either the BPharm or MPharm degree is accepted for registration as a practicing pharmacist.

See list of pharmacy schools: Australia for a listing of institutions offering the MPharm degree.

MPharm (Clinical)/MClinPharm

With the success and popularity of the MPharm coursework degrees, research MPharm degrees have now been redesignated Master of Pharmacy (Clinical) (abbreviated MPharm (Clinical)) or  Master of Clinical Pharmacy (abbreviated MClinPharm). This degree offers advanced training to graduates of a Bachelor of Pharmacy, and does not by itself meet the requirements for registration as a pharmacist. These are the following colleges imparting M Pharma in India in various specialties like Industrial Pharmacy, Bulk Drugs, Pharmacology, Pharmaceutics, Pharmacognosy, Pharmaceutical Biotechnology etc.:
MIT World Peace University School Of Pharmacy , Pune
 Nalanda college of Pharmacy, Nalgonda
 Gyani Inder Singh Institute of Professional Studies, Dehradun
 J.S.S College of Pharmacy, Mysore/ Ootty
 Pad. Dr. D. Y. Patil Institute of Pharmaceutical Science and Research, Pimpri, Pune, Maharashtra, India
 Department of Pharmaceutical Sciences, Guru Nanak Dev University(GNDU), Amritsar, Punjab
 Hindu College of Pharmacy, sonepat, Haryana.
 Dr. Hari Singh Gour University, Sagar, Madhya Pradesh
 Suresh Gyan Vihar University, Jaipur, Rajasthan
 Alwar Pharmacy college, Alwar, Rajasthan
 Sri Jayadev College of Pharmaceutical Sciences, Naharkanta, Bhubaneswar.
 Bombay College of Pharmacy, Mumbai, Maharashtra
 Banaras Hindu University (BHU ), Varanasi, Uttar Pradesh
 Delhi Institute of Pharmaceutical Sciences and Research (DIPSAR), New Delhi
 ISF College of Pharmacy, Moga, Punjab
 Manipal University, Bangalore, Karanataka
 Madras Medical College, Chennai, Tamil Nadu
 NIPERs at Mohali, Hajipur, Rae baraeli, Hyderabad etc.
 Jamia Hamdard University,Delhi
Mahakal institute of pharmaceutical studies, Ujjain
 Department of Pharmaceutical sciences and drug research Punjabi University Patiala
 Shri Guru Ram Rai institute of technology and science Dehradun(Uttarakhand Technical University, Dehradun)
 Department of Pharmacology, KIET School of Pharmacy, Ghaziabad 201 206 www.kiet.edu
 Department of Pharmacology, KIET, Ghaziabad, NCR Delhi
 NSHM College of Pharmaceutical Technology, Kolkata, West Bengal
Himalayan Pharmacy Institute, Majhitar, East Sikkim
University Department of Pharmaceutical Science, Utkal University, Bhubaneswar, Odisha

Bangladesh
1.  Department of Pharmacy, University of Development Alternative (UODA) 

2. Faculty of Pharmacy, University of Dhaka 

3. Department of Pharmacy, Jagannath University 

4. Department of Pharmacy, State University of Bangladesh 

5. Department of Pharmacy, University of Science and Technology Chittagong 

6. Department of Pharmaceutical Sciences- North South University (NSU), Masters in Pharmacology and Clinical Pharmacy (PCP), Masters in Pharmaceutical Technology (PTB), MPharm in Dual Major

Pakistan

The postgraduate MPhil program is offered in Pakistan instead of Master of Pharmacy in four disciplines, namely, pharmaceutics, pharmaceutical chemistry, pharmacology and pharmacognosy. A new discipline, pharmacy practice, is also introduced by some universities.

Kenya 
In Kenya, the School of Pharmacy, University of Nairobi, offers three Master of Pharmacy degrees:
 Master of Pharmacy in Pharmacoepidemiology & Pharmacovigilance.
 Master of Pharmacy in Clinical Pharmacy (M.Pharm. Clin.Pharm) offered by the Department of Pharmaceutics and Pharmacy Practice
 Master of Pharmacy in Industrial Pharmacy (M.Pharm. Ind.Pharm) offered by the Department of Pharmaceutics and Pharmacy Practice
These are 2-year Master's degree programs that have both taught and research components.

See also
Bachelor of Pharmacy
Doctor of Pharmacy
Pharmacist
Pharmaconomist
Pharmacy

References

PharmD 4 Years to be completed 

Pharmacy, Master of
Pharmacy education